Asad Umar       (born 18 September 1961) is a Pakistani politician who had been a member of the National Assembly of Pakistan from September 2013 till May 2018 and again from August 2018 till January 2023. He served as the Federal Minister for Planning, Development, Reforms and Special Initiatives, from 19 November 2019 to 10 April 2022.

He has previously served as Chairman House Standing Committee on Finance, Revenue and Economic Affairs from 8 May 2019 till 30 November 2019 and Finance, Revenue, and Economic Affairs Minister of Pakistan from 20 August 2018 to 18 April 2019. Prior to entering politics, he was a business executive, serving as the chief executive officer (CEO) of Engro Corporation from 2004 to 2012.
He is currently serving as secretary-general of Pakistan Tehreek-e-Insaf since December 2021.

Early life and education
In an interview, Umar said he was born in Rawalpindi in 1961 and is the youngest of six brothers and one sister. After his father's retirement from military, he moved to Karachi along with his family. Umar received a degree in Commerce (B.Com) at the Government College of Commerce & Economics. He graduated from IBA Karachi in 1984 from where he received an MBA degree..

Asad Umar's father, Major General (retd) Ghulam Umar, was an army officer who was considered a close aide and served as first Advisor of National Security Council (NSC) created by the government of President Yahya Khan. He is also the youngest brother of Mohammad Zubair, who currently serves as Chief Spokesperson of Nawaz Sharif and Maryam Safdar and was also appointed as 32nd Governor of Sindh by Pakistan Muslim League-N government.

Professional career
He worked in HSBC Pakistan after graduation for seven months. He joined Exxon Chemical Pakistan in 1985 as a business analyst and was based in Canada. He was the only Pakistani employee of Exxon working abroad (in Canada) when the famous management buyout of Engro took place in 1991. Umar came back to Pakistan and in 1997 was appointed the first CEO of Engro Polymer & Chemicals, the group’s petrochemical arm.

He became the President and CEO of Engro Corporation in 2004. He immediately made the company take a global perspective, becoming the first Pakistani private sector firm to hire the top (and expensive) US consulting firm McKinsey & Company to help create the Engro’s strategy. As a result, Engro made changes to its corporate structure and went on a global expansion kick, buying out a US-based food company and started expanding into the fertiliser business in North Africa to supply the European market.

In 2009, he was awarded Sitara-i-Imtiaz for his public service.

He took an early retirement as president and CEO from Engro in April 2012 at the age of 50 amid speculation that he would pursue a political career.

Umar is credited for turning a chemical company into a major conglomerate and is considered one of the most popular and highly paid CEOs in Pakistan. During his tenure as CEO of Engro Corporation, Umar was paid about PKR 68.6 million for the year 2011.

Political career

Early years (2012-2018) 
He joined Pakistan Tehreek-e-Insaf (PTI) in 2012 and was made Senior Vice President.

He was elected to the National Assembly of Pakistan from Constituency NA-48 (Islamabad-I) as a candidate of PTI in by-election held in August 2013. He received 48,073 votes and defeated a candidate of Pakistan Muslim League (N) and became an MNA. After Pakistan General Elections 2013, Asad served in the following Standing Committees of the National Assembly:

 Standing Committee on Industries and Production. (Chairman Committee from 2013 till 2018)
 Standing Committee on Cabinet Secretariat.
 Standing Committee on Finance, Revenue and Economic Affairs.

In 2014, Lahore University of Management Sciences cancelled a scheduled speech of Umar due to being political in nature rather than educational.

Re-election and ministries (2018-present) 
He was re-elected to the National Assembly as a candidate of PTI from Constituency NA-54 (Islamabad-III) in 2018 Pakistani general election. He received 56,945 votes and defeated Anjum Aqeel Khan and again became an MNA. After Pakistan General Elections 2018, Asad served in the following Standing Committees of the National Assembly:

 Special Committee on Agricultural Products.
 Non-Ministerial Standing Committee on Business Advisory.
 Standing Committee on Finance, Revenue and Economic Affairs. (Chairman Committee from 8 May 2019 till 30 November 2019)

Following his successful election, Umar was named as the potential candidate for the office of Minister for Finance, Revenue, and Economic Affairs. On 20 August 2018, he was sworn in as the Finance, Revenue and Economic Affairs Minister of Pakistan in the Federal Cabinet of Prime Minister Imran Khan. On 18 September 2018, he presented amended finance bill for fiscal year 2018-2019 in the National Assembly.

On 11 October 2018, Umar held a meeting with Christine Lagarde, chair of the International Monetary Fund (IMF) and formally applied for bailout package. Keeping in view the bad economic conditions left by the previous government, some quarters thought delay in applying for loans and bailout packages would cost Pakistan dearly. Ironically, the same PML-N leaders who claimed they had brought Pakistan's economy back on track, criticized Asad for applying for bailout late as economy was a disaster after PML-N's joyride in power.

The same month news reports emerged that Prime Minister Imran Khan has expressed dissatisfaction and reservations over Umar's performance as Minister for Finance, Revenue and Economic Affairs - claims that were refuted. On 18 April 2019, he stepped down from the Finance Ministry.

From 8 May 2019 till 30 November 2019, Asad Umar served as the Chairman Standing Committee of the National Assembly of Pakistan for Finance, Revenue, and Economic Affairs. This is a key office as the chairman can ask the finance minister and his ministry regarding their performance. Moreover, the chairman can also give advice the finance minister and the finance ministry regarding their policies. On 9 July 2019, Umar started working as the Member of Economic Advisory Council (Pakistan) after the recommendations of Prime Minister Khan.

He is working as the Focal person for Supervision & Coordination amongst Government Agencies for All Mega Projects in Karachi funded by Federal government of Pakistan since 1 November 2019.

On 30 September 2019, news emerged that Imran khan will do a reshuffle, in cabinet and Umar would return in the cabinet. On 19 November 2019, he was reinducted into Federal Cabinet and appointed as Federal Minister for Planning, Development, Reforms and Special Initiatives.

He is working as the Chairman of the cabinet committee on China–Pakistan Economic Corridor.

On 20 March 2020, he was appointed as the Chairman of Cabinet Committee on Energy, replacing Abdul Hafeez Shaikh. He also chaired the National Command and Operation Center (NCOC) that dealt with the COVID-19 pandemic in Pakistan.

Chairman PTI Imran Khan appointed Asad Umar as PTI secretary-general on 25 Dec 2021.

References

1961 births
Living people
Finance Ministers of Pakistan
Pakistani chief executives
Pakistani MNAs 2013–2018
Pakistani MNAs 2018–2023
Recipients of Sitara-i-Imtiaz
Pakistani expatriates in Canada
Pakistan Tehreek-e-Insaf MNAs
Businesspeople from Karachi
Politicians from Karachi
Politicians from Islamabad
Muhajir people
Institute of Business Administration, Karachi alumni
Engro Corporation